Episodes is a sitcom created by David Crane and Jeffrey Klarik and produced by Hat Trick Productions. It premiered on Showtime in the United States on January 9, 2011 and on BBC Two in the United Kingdom on January 10, 2011. The show is about a British husband-and-wife comedy writing team who travel to Hollywood to remake their successful British TV series, with unexpected results. It stars Matt LeBlanc portraying a satirical version of himself. LeBlanc made his regular return to television for the first time since he was on NBC's Joey.

On June 10, 2015, it was announced that Showtime had renewed Episodes for a fifth season, which was due to begin filming in London in 2016. On April 11, 2016, Season 5 was confirmed to be the show's last; it consists of seven episodes and premiered on August 20, 2017. The series finale, Season 5's "Episode Seven", aired on October 8, 2017.

Episodes has received positive reviews by critics, with specific praise being given to the performances of stars Stephen Mangan, Tamsin Greig, and Matt LeBlanc. For his performance in the series, Matt LeBlanc won a Golden Globe Award for Best Actor – Television Series Musical or Comedy and has been nominated for four Primetime Emmy Awards.

Premise

After married couple Sean (Stephen Mangan) and Beverly (Tamsin Greig) Lincoln win yet another BAFTA Award for their successful British sitcom, Lyman's Boys, they are persuaded to move to Hollywood and remake their series for an American audience. Unfortunately, the network starts to make changes (including the title, now Pucks!), and pressures the couple into casting Matt LeBlanc in the lead role, a part that Matt is largely unsuited for.

Sean becomes friends with Matt, while Beverly is less impressed. Continuing changes to the scripts threaten to damage the show and other pressures result in difficulties in Sean and Beverly's marriage.

Development and production
In May 2010, the BBC announced that seven episodes had been ordered and that filming had begun, with James Griffiths directing. Sean and Beverly Lincoln were played by Stephen Mangan and Tamsin Greig, who previously co-starred in the British sitcom Green Wing (2004–2007).

Beverly was originally to be portrayed by Claire Forlani, but she left the cast in April 2010 when the series was in pre-production. LeBlanc was to play a "larger than life version of himself" as character Matt LeBlanc. Thomas Haden Church was also to have a role in the series as Merc Lapidus, the American television executive who commissions the remake, but he left due to scheduling conflicts, and was replaced by John Pankow.

Although the majority of the show was set in Los Angeles, the first season was mainly filmed in the UK, including the 103-room mansion Updown Court that Sean and Beverly Lincoln briefly stayed in. Inserts were shot on location in LA. LeBlanc's Malibu mansion was also UK-based. Seasons 2–5 were shot primarily in Los Angeles.

Episodes

Cast and characters

Main
 Matt LeBlanc as a fictionalized version of himself. Matt is a wealthy, charming, but arrogant actor, who was persuaded by the high salary to take the starring role of Coach Lyman in Pucks. He has a short attention span and need for immediate gratification. He has two sons, who spend most of their time with their mother Diane (Fiona Glascott), with whom Matt has an antagonistic yet ultimately protective relationship.
 Stephen Mangan as Sean Lincoln – co-creator of Pucks. Sean moves from London to Hollywood with his wife and co-creator Beverly to adapt their award-winning show Lyman's Boys for American audiences. Sean initially adapts to Hollywood better than Beverly, finding it easier to bond with Matt on some level than she does. Although he grows to loathe Hollywood and professes to want to return home, Sean stays because the paychecks are much bigger.
 Tamsin Greig as Beverly Lincoln – co-creator of Pucks. When Beverly and Sean move to Hollywood, she is quickly overwhelmed by the new lifestyle. Unlike Sean, Beverly struggles to adjust to life in Los Angeles, and the only person she feels close to is network executive Carol Rance (Kathleen Rose Perkins), with whom she often goes hiking in Griffith Park and smokes pot.
 John Pankow as Merc Lapidus – the president of the network. He purchases the American rights to Lyman's Boys without watching it, based on the acclaim it has received, but immediately insists on major changes which ultimately have a significant impact on the quality of the show. He is boorish and arrogant, lies to everybody to avoid responsibility and has a very short attention span. He is cheating on his blind wife with his network subordinate, Carol.
 Kathleen Rose Perkins as Carol Rance – the network's head of programming. She is Merc's second-in-command. Carol is very good at her job, but she often undermines herself professionally because she has a fetish for people who have authority over her, leading her to engage in a series of affairs with her bosses. She becomes good friends with Beverly.
 Mircea Monroe as Morning Randolph – the leading actress employed by the network to play Nicola McCutcheon opposite Matt's character on Pucks. A running gag throughout the show is that Morning's age, while never explicitly revealed, is significantly older than her appearance suggests. She has frequent plastic surgery to maintain the appearance of youth which she feels Hollywood insists on from actresses. Morning perceives herself as a household name equal to Matt because she was "Kelly" on the show Kelly Girl many years ago. She has a 19-year-old daughter, Dawn, whom she pretends is her younger sister.

Recurring
 Joseph May as Andy Button (seasons 1–5) – the head of casting of the network. By the end of Season 1, he is fired by Merc because he likes the talking dog show Merc hates. In Season 2, he is re-hired when he threatens a lawsuit against the network.
 Daisy Haggard as Myra Licht (seasons 1–5) – the head of comedy of the network. She constantly makes negative facial expressions and utters disapproving noises. In Season 4, she obliviously becomes pregnant and ultimately gives birth.
 Genevieve O'Reilly as Jamie Lapidus (seasons 1–3) – Merc's third wife who is blind, but can surprisingly get around. She is aware of Merc's affair with Carol and eventually leaves him for Matt.
 Sophie Rundle as Labia (seasons 2–3) – Matt's stalker who has been stalking Matt for 15 years. She was a Make-A-Wish child whose wish had Matt take her to Disneyland, but she survives cancer and starts stalking him, leading to him getting a restraining order against her. Nevertheless, he has slept with her more than once. She subsequently outgrows Matt in Season 3.
 Fiona Glascott as Diane (seasons 1–5) – Matt's ex-wife who is often angry at Matt, but still feels some affection for him. She is overprotective of their two sons.
 Michael Brandon as Elliot Salad (seasons 2–5) – the chairman of the network. 
 Chris Diamantopoulos as Castor Sotto (seasons 3–4) – Merc's replacement as network executive. Castor has significant psychological issues and bold ideas for changes at the network.
 Andrea Savage as Helen Basch (seasons 4–5) – Castor's replacement as network executive. Helen is a lesbian who demonstrates good instincts about creative ideas, but is prone to jealousy.
 Alex Rocco as Dick LeBlanc (seasons 3–4) – Matt's father from whom he is estranged, although he supports him financially.
 Caroline Aaron as Linda (seasons 3–5) – Dick's crotchety girlfriend who takes care of and lives with him. She keeps Matt in the loop about his father, although she and Matt don't really get along well.
 Rhoda Gemignani as Mrs. LeBlanc (seasons 4–5) – Matt's almost-deaf mother who requires hearing aids in order to hear better. 
 Oliver Kieran-Jones as Andrew Lesley (seasons 1–4) – Sean and Beverly's former personal assistant who becomes smug towards them due to his rapid rise in show business.
 Bruce Mackinnon as Tim Whittick (seasons 4–5) – Sean's former writing partner, with whom he stopped writing with after beginning a creative and romantic relationship with Beverly. According to Beverly, Tim refers to her as Yoko Ono by somehow adding the phrase "oh no" into their conversations.
 Nigel Planer as Sanford Shamiro (seasons 2–4) – Matt's lawyer. He always handles the ramifications of Matt's actions and tends to be very frustrated with Matt as a result.
 Roger Bart as Roger Riskin (seasons 3–5) – Matt's agent, who generally pitches him ideas that are high-paying but humiliating. [NOTE: William Hope was Matt's agent in Seasons 1.]
 Andrea Rosen as Eileen Jaffee (seasons 3–5) – an agent at William Morris Endeavor who takes in Sean and Beverly as her clients. She always goes out of her way to act on Sean and Beverly's projects without their consent. 
 Ella Kenion as Beth (seasons 3–5) – Matt's publicist. She handles Matt's public statements whenever news of Matt's controversial actions break out.
 Geoff McGivern as Bob (season 4) – Matt's finance manager. He gives Matt woes whenever he calls him, with Matt knowing that it usually involves his money, yielding the two words the latter dreads the most, "It's Bob."
 James Purefoy as Rob (season 2) – Morning's younger brother, who briefly dates Beverly.
 Scarlett Rose Patterson as Wendy (seasons 2–4) – Sean and Beverly's monotonous personal assistant. She never concentrates on her work and often tries to leave early.
 Sam Palladio as Stoke Stamon (seasons 2–4) – a 31-year old actor who plays the ice hockey team player Howie in Pucks! He does well in Hollywood because he is the one "with the hair".
 Harry McEntire as Jason Julius (seasons 2–3) – a 27-year old actor who plays the ice hockey team player Max in Pucks! In Season 2, he reveals to Sean and Beverly that he, Stoke and Kevin are much older than they look and that he's entering his second marriage.
 Jacob Anderson as Kevin Garillo (season 2) – a 29-year old actor who plays the ice hockey team player Kyle in Pucks! His character in the show has two gay fathers. [NOTE: Eros Vlahos' character in Season 1, "Pucks! Boy", also has two gay fathers like Kevin, making it unclear whether or not both actors played the same character in Pucks!.]
 Rufus Jones as Anthony Powner Smith (seasons 3 & 5) – a British actor who initially replaces Matt in Andrew's NBC pilot but gets temporarily paralyzed after a kickboxing accident.
 Lou Hirsch as Wallace (season 1) – the security guard at the gates of the Beverly Hills estates where Sean and Beverly live in Season 1. He never remembers the two and often gives them trouble in letting them inside the gates. Fed up with his memory loss for a third time, Beverly succeeds in making a profanity-laced demand for him to open the gate.

Reception
The response of American critics was positive. Robert Bianco of USA Today called the show "easily the best new sitcom of the season" and The Boston Globes Matthew Gilbert said that "Each of the season's seven half-hours is a little sliver of pleasure." A Boston Herald review by Mark A. Perigard was lukewarm; he said he feared that the show would never achieve a broad audience, and David Wiegand from the San Francisco Chronicle praised the performances of the actors but felt that the series simply was not funny. Alan Sepinwall of HitFix went further declaring the show to be one of the worst TV moments of 2011. The UK critics' response to the first episode was broadly lukewarm while remaining optimistic. More screentime for Matt LeBlanc was eagerly anticipated by some, with The Independents Brian Viner believing that this might improve the series.

The second season received positive reviews from critics. Henry Goldblatt of Entertainment Weekly called the second season "a terrific second season of this industry-set sitcom." USA Today said of the show: "As smartly written as it is played, Episodes offers the comic pleasures, not just of clashing cultures, but of contrasting comic styles. On one side you have LeBlanc, who handles the big laughs and the broader humor, and does it so well, it serves as a reminder that he was under-appreciated during his years on Friends." Ed Bark of Uncle Barky praised the season saying it was "a thoroughly entertaining romp, with the television industry as a combination Tilt-A-Whirl/merry-go-round." On the Firewall & Iceberg podcast Alan Sepinwall and Dan Fienberg commented on the second season, saying that the "self-congratulatory, obvious" show that is "oddly tone-deaf about the business that it was trying to satirize" is "not about anything" and "as a result is better for it," but is still "groaningly unfunny".

The third season received mixed reviews from critics. Emily Nussbaum of The New Yorker gave the season a positive review, saying "It seemed doubtful that the show’s creators could keep those plates spinning for another round, but the third season introduces a fantastic new contrivance: a psychotic new network head, played by Chris Diamantopoulos." Brian Lowry of Variety gave the season a lukewarm review, praising Matt LeBlanc's performance, writing: "Episodes remains distinguished, mostly, by Matt LeBlanc's gameness in playing a jaundiced, utterly self-absorbed version of himself, the classic stereotype of a sitcom star with an oversized ego.". Phil Dyess-Nugent of The A.V. Club gave the season a "C+" grade and a mixed review, writing: "It's turned out to be a fairly tired satire of Hollywood, one that's stayed yoked to its dubious premise."

In the UK, episode one of the series premiered with an audience of 1.86 million, an audience share of 8.5%. Episode Two received 1.53 million viewers (7.4%) – and by Episode Four, viewing numbers were down to 1.09 million (5.3%). Episode Five saw a slight rise in viewers to 1.33 million (6.6%), but numbers once again fell for Episode Six to 1.12 million (5.5%) and the season ended with the lowest number of viewers, 1.06 million (5.1%), tuning in for the final episode. The second series in the UK began with 1.34 million, audience share of 6.8%, but by episode seven had steadily declined to 0.68 million viewers and an audience share of 3.3%. As in the US, the UK's reception to the second series was positive with The Arts Desk saying "There were some very funny industry-related gags, not least network boss Merc (John Pankow) and his PA-cum-mistress Carol (Kathleen Rose Perkins) having sex on his desk while roaring the ratings figures back at one another. The cast are excellent value but at the moment only Greig seems to be playing for genuine emotional stakes. Portraying an exaggerated version of his on-screen persona, LeBlanc’s sweet, sex-obsessed shallowness is all that's required, but Mangan – a terrific comic actor – seems constantly to be toying with a smirk, devaluing some of the emotional currency you sense Episodes is striving for. Together, they've proved they can make us laugh."

Broadcast
The series premiered in Australia on Nine on July 3, 2012, with season two returning on September 4, 2012. The first two seasons were replayed by subscription television network BBC UKTV (as opposed to Nine which is a free-to-air network), premiering January 28, 2014. Unlike the first two seasons which premiered in Australia on Nine, season three premiered on pay TV. Although originally set to air on BBC UKTV, the series premiered on BBC First on September 12, 2014, and returned for season four on September 7, 2015. On November 14, 2016, it was reported that the fifth and final season would have its premiere on streaming provider Stan in 2017. This move is believed to be the result of BBC no longer being a co-producer of the series and that Stan has an output agreement with Showtime.

Awards and nominations

Home media
The series was released gradually over time onto DVD Region 1 as follows:

The entire series has also been made available on DVD Region 2.

References

External links
 for Showtime

2010s American satirical television series
2010s American sitcoms
2011 American television series debuts
2017 American television series endings
2010s British satirical television series
2010s British sitcoms
2011 British television series debuts
2018 British television series endings
BBC television sitcoms
Cultural depictions of American men
Cultural depictions of comedians
English-language television shows
Lesbian-related television shows
Metafictional television series
Showtime (TV network) original programming
Television series about marriage
Television series about television
Television series by CBS Studios
Television series by Hat Trick Productions
Television series created by David Crane (producer)
Television shows set in England
Television shows set in Los Angeles